Dina Dahbany-Miraglia (born 1938, New York City) is an American-born Yemeni linguistic anthropologist.

She is an alumna of a girls-only Orthodox Ashkenazi yeshiva, Hunter College, and Columbia University, earning a Ph.D. (anthropology, 1983). Her work has focused on Yemenite Jews and her teaching on ESL. Dahbany-Miraglia served as a professor at Queensborough Community College (a branch of City University of New York) until her retirement.

Marriages
Dina Dahbany married, firstly, to
Joseph Miraglia in 1960 (license number 22535) in  issued in Manhattan, New York. She married, secondly, to Steven Kutyna, on October 24, 2000, in Queens, New York.

Publications

 Verbal protective behavior among Yemenite Jews, 1975
 The Yemenite Jewish community, 1980
 An analysis of ethnic identity among Yemenite Jews in the greater New York area, 1982
 Yemenite Jewish poetry, 1982
 American Yemenite Jewish dance : the oldtimers and their children, 1988
 Speaking American English well, 1999

References

1938 births
Living people
Scientists from New York City
Social anthropologists
Linguists from the United States
Hunter College alumni
Columbia Graduate School of Arts and Sciences alumni
American women anthropologists
20th-century American women scientists
20th-century American scientists
Women linguists
Queensborough Community College faculty
21st-century American women